Half Moon Lake is located near Milltown, Wisconsin.

Recreation
Half Moon Lake is located in Polk County, Wisconsin (near Balsam Lake).  Many different varieties of panfish (bluegill, sunfish, black crappie, yellow perch, and rock bass) and sport fish (largemouth bass, walleye, and northern pike) can be found in the lake. Which make it a popular destination for fishermen. Other recreational activities include boating, canoeing, swimming and water-skiing in summer and ice fishing and snowmobiling in the winter.  The lake has one public beach and one public boat access, both located at the north west end.

External links
Half Moon Lake Protection and Rehabilitation.

Lakes of Polk County, Wisconsin
Tourist attractions in Polk County, Wisconsin
Oxbow lakes of the United States